Midnights With Menka, is a 2018 Gujarati comedy-drama film produced by Rashmin Majithia and written and directed by Viral Shah. This is a fake biopic of Gujarati film’s superstar Malhar Thakar, who finds a quick hack to his way to stardom followed by the consequences he has to face.

Plot 
‘Midnights With Menka’ revolves around Malhar Thakar, the superstar of Gujarati film world and his rich best friend Hardik, his biggest fangirl, Esha and his suboptimal sister Riya.

Hunger for success and fame leads them to indulge in some undesirable scenarios and obstacles, making their troubled lives even harder. Seeking a way to save their doomed worlds, they take a bouncy ride through friendship, fame, humour, love and a plethora of emotions.

Will Malhar and gang overcome these situations? Or will the situations get the best of them?

Cast 

 Malhar Thakar as Malhar
 Esha Kansara as Esha
 Hardik Sangani as Hardik
 Vinita Mahesh as Riya
 Parth Oza as Rahul
 Ragi Jani as Police Inspector (Special Appearance)

Soundtrack 

Music Director Ambresh Shroff has composed the film’s music along with a song "I am the Superstar" sung by Ambresh Shroff and lyrics by Dilip Rawal. Kya Jawaa Gaya sung by Ash King and Shruti Pathak. Songs Mixed And mastered by Aftab khan at Headroom Studio and Assisted by Vatsal Chevli.

Reception
The Times of India rated it 3/5 and said, "Overall, it's an average watch with a constant dose of humour."

References

External links 

 

Indian comedy-drama films
2010s Gujarati-language films
2018 comedy-drama films